Ninbusuiso Dam is a gravity dam located in Toyama prefecture in Japan. The dam is used for power production. The catchment area of the dam is 0.8 km2. The dam impounds about   ha of land when full and can store 13 thousand cubic meters of water. The construction of the dam was started on 1960 and completed in 1961.

References

Dams in Toyama Prefecture
1961 establishments in Japan